Jaime Enrique Duque Correa (4 April 1943 − 14 April 2013) was a Colombian Roman Catholic.

Ordained to the priesthood on 5 November 1967, Duque Correa was named bishop of the Roman Catholic Diocese of El Banco, Colombia on 17 January 2006 and died on 14 April 2013 while still in office.

References

1943 births
2013 deaths
People from Medellín
21st-century Roman Catholic bishops in Colombia
Roman Catholic bishops of El Banco